Navarre is a census-designated place and unincorporated community in Santa Rosa County in the northwest Florida Panhandle. It is a major bedroom community for mostly U.S. military personnel, federal civil servants, local population, retirees and defense contractors. Navarre has grown from being a small town of around 1,500 in 1970 to a town with a population estimated at 43,540 , if including both the Navarre and Navarre Beach Census Designated Places.

The community is roughly centered on the junction of U.S. Route 98 and State Road 87. It is part of the Pensacola–Ferry Pass–Brent Metropolitan Statistical Area (more commonly referred to as the Pensacola Metro Area), and is the second largest community in the metropolitan area, according to a study. Navarre is the third-largest community in the Florida Panhandle.

Navarre is the principal community of the census-defined Navarre-Miramar Beach-Destin Urbanized Area. The community is known for the natural environment, swimming, picnic spots, and its beach.

History

The Pez-Sigüenza Expedition of 1693

In 1693 Spanish explorers Carlos de Sigüenza y Góngora and Admiral Andrés de Pez y Malzárraga set sail from Veracruz. A skilled cartographer, scientist, mathematician, and theologian, Sigüenza was responsible for scouting and mapping possible sites of Spanish colonization in Northwest Florida during the expedition. While traveling in the area of East Bay in April 1693 the Spanish discovered what is today called the East Bay River. In honor of Captain Jordan de Reina, an officer who had taken part in the Barroto-Romero voyage of 1686 as well as Sigüenza's in 1693, the Spanish dubbed the waters on which they traveled, "The River Jordan".

On April 11, 1693, while sailing up East Bay River, sailors aboard the Spanish ships noticed a group of Native Americans observing from a camp near the shore. In order to greet the natives, a landing party was sent out. By the time the Spanish reached the shore, however, the Native Americans were gone. As the Natives quickly abandoned camp the Spanish discovered half-cooked pieces of buffalo meat sitting over a fire, along with a fierce dog guarding the site. Due to the great number of oak trees in the area the campsite was named "El Robledal," meaning "The Oakgrove" in Spanish. After erecting a wooden cross and leaving gifts for the natives, the Spaniards continued their exploration upriver. Upon later return to El Robledal, the explorers noticed that their gifts had been taken. In return, the natives had also constructed a wooden cross and left a buffalo hide as a peace offering. The earliest known map of Robledal dates from 1693, the same year as the Pez-Sigüenza Expedition. Three years later, in a 1698 map by Don Andrés de Arriola y Guzmán (the first governor of a settlement in the Pensacola area after the Tristán de Luna y Arellano colony was abandoned), Robledal is again noted.

Axelson Point and Early Settlement

Settlement and shipyard 
Settlers are noted as living in the area since at least 1827, when a map of West Florida includes listings of families by the name of Wyman and Williams living along Santa Rosa Sound in what would become Navarre. The Wyman family is believed to be related to Guy Wyman, who, along with his wife, would name the area "Navarre" and is now generally recognized as the town founder. The Williams family is likely the source of the name of William's Creek.

While various settlers had been present in the area since before this time, Robledal was again populated sometime near 1856, with the establishment of a homestead by the Axelson Family. Due to the relative lack of information on the other families, as well as their homestead's location at Robledal, they are often considered Navarre's first settlers. Their home was along the shore of the East Bay, on a small cape, in which, they are now the namesake, after the point was officially designated, Axelson Point.

Soon after their settlement in what would become Navarre, they established a shipyard on Axelson Point, jutting into what was also then called, Axelson Cove. The shipyard was considered to be mostly successful, as the family made a business of fixing ships in port in the nearby deep-water port in Pensacola and the river port in Milton, as well as building large-scale ships of their own. The shipyard was in operation until approximately 1890.

Civil War 
During the American Civil War, despite the political ideology of citizens in the local area, records make it seem as though the Axelson's were pro-union. This is substantiated by a record showing that, while many businesses in the area were becoming ruined due to the Union blockade of southern ports, the Axelson's shipyard was quite busy and prosperous, primarily from business completed with the Union navy and the United States Merchant Marines. This notion is conflicted with local tradition noted in Log of the Peep O'Day, an account of the area from the 1910s, which suggest that the Axelsons built one of the first ships registered under the flag of the Confederacy. However, as confirmed by evidence gathered by historians at the University of West Florida, this notion was likely caused by a confusion between the Axelsons and shipbuilding operations in nearby Milton, Florida.

In addition, some records and books, such as the Atlas of Florida, attest that Union raids were made against Confederate troops and camps stationed elsewhere in Northwest Florida, through routes in what would become Navarre and Holley, Florida. No evidence exists that the Axelsons assisted such missions. A military road that appears to approximate this route is noted as existing as late as 1895, where it can be found on War Department maps from that time period.

Bilowry and Hiawatha

Some maps of the area during this time, seem to indicate that the area was also known as “Bilowry,” a presumed misspelling or combination of the name, Bill Lowry. The area also had a post office under this name from 1886 to 1891.

Habitation of this area of what is now Navarre was continuous, though sparse from the Axelsons to the platting of Navarre. This area also came to be known as Hiawatha during a brief time, with a neighborhood in Navarre still retaining this name.

Town of Eagan
Some 30 years after the first homestead in the area was established, seemingly coinciding with the community of Bilowry, a small settlement named Eagan arose in 1874. The post office was run by Patrick Shea, a naturalized American from Ireland. The settlement, composed of approximately 40 families, was located off the Santa Rosa Sound and encompassed a portion of present-day Navarre. The settlement, which formerly existed as a post office location, was named after a local postmaster, John Eagan Esq., a Pensacola lawyer and politician. Following the post office's discontinuation on September 11, 1884, families continued to live in the area, and the town continued to appear on area maps even into the 1890s. While what became of the town and the people who lived there at that time is unknown (some of which are known to have remained in the town, some of which are believed to have moved to neighboring communities), the discovery of the town's existence definitively established the settlement of the Navarre area in South Santa Rosa County as being prior to the 20th century. The land upon which Eagan existed would, in fact, later become what is now known as Navarre.

Guy Wyman and town development
The founder of Navarre, under the name of Navarre, was Guy Wyman, a colonel in the United States Army. During World War I, he met a French nurse named Noelle. At the time, immigration policies would not allow him to bring her to the United States as a fiancée or even as a wife, but he could bring her back as his legal child. Colonel Wyman, therefore, adopted her and brought her back to the Florida panhandle, where he purchased a large amount of land. Noelle named their holdings Navarre, after the province in Spain, near France. Wyman platted the town in 1925, but made no steps towards development. However, during the Great Depression, the Wymans could not pay the taxes on it and were forced to begin selling it off. Part of that property is where the Navarre Park is today.

Modern era
In modern times, Navarre has become one of the fastest-growing communities in Florida. While protecting and enhancing the natural environment of the area; many steps have been taken to develop luxury accommodations, water activities, boutique shopping, scenic trails, schools and nature/educational opportunities.

Hurricanes Ivan and Dennis 
Navarre has been impacted significantly by hurricanes. Immediately preceding Hurricane Ivan and Hurricane Dennis, Navarre was seeing a new strand of growth and economic advancement. This, however, quickly came to a close, as Navarre suffered horribly during the events of those hurricanes. Many planned developments stopped and decided to delay their plans until a later date, many of which were never resumed or completed. This hard mark against Navarre lingered until the mid and late 2010s.

Helicopter crash
On March 10, 2015, a UH-60, call sign MOJO 69, from the Louisiana National Guard, crashed in the Santa Rosa Sound off the coast of the community of Navarre. All eleven on board were believed killed. On November 18, 2016, Leadership Santa Rosa Class 29 unveiled the Navarre Black Hawk Memorial in Navarre Park. The memorial was built to honor the men who died in the Black Hawk crash and anyone who has paid the ultimate sacrifice in service to the United States.

Protests
2017 and 2018 had seen a noticeable rise in civil activism in the Navarre area, with three notable protests occurring, all within the span of 12 months.

The first protests recorded in the community occurred on June 9, 2017, after the county unilaterally changed the town's nickname and locally popular welcome sign. The change was made without the consent of the citizens of the town and have sparked additional calls for the incorporation of the community as a municipality.

In 2018, there were protests against the Holley-Navarre Water System. The protests were over the water system's potential violations of the Florida Sunshine Law, which guarantees the rights for citizens and residents to access the meetings and public records of government agencies. The alleged violations occurred when the board of directors of the agency met for what they called a "secret" meeting. The board president stated these meetings were closed due to their nature of discussing legal matters between members of the board and of several attorneys and lawyers. A new board was later elected, largely diffusing the situation. The water system has subsequently received critism after the new water board appointed a former Santa Rosa County commissioner who had just been voted out of his seat a month before his hiring. A later CEO of the water system was dismissed af undisclosed felony charges were discovered.

The third notable protests were part of the larger national school walkout to promote gun control. While small, only consisting of a few students, it is considered notable in local political circles, as Navarre is in Florida's 1st congressional district, which is often polled as being the most conservative, and arguably the most pro-gun region in the state of Florida. There has been some speculation that this signals a larger change in the ideology of this region, as the younger generation begins to reach the voting age.

On June 3, 2020, there was a protest at Navarre Park as part of the George Floyd protests. It consisted of around 120 protestors and was followed by a candlelight vigil at the main pavilion of the park.

New expansion
For the first time since before hurricanes Ivan and Dennis, Navarre is now not only expanding in population, but in attractions, dining establishments, and other tourist options as well. In 2017 and 2018 alone, Navarre saw the opening of several major housing and apartment complexes, a brand new hotel, a new prototype Walmart Neighborhood Store, and several new restaurants. Expansion has since continued with the construction of additioanl retail and box stores, residential complexes, and entertainment centers near the community's central business district. New development was announced in 2020 that would additionally expand commercial options on the east side of the community.

In 2020, following a failed effort in 2014, a new effort in incorporating has been established by a local political action committee, the Navarre Area United PAC. However, the PAC was delayed in collecting petition signatories to get the issue of incorporation on the ballot due to the COVID-19 outbreak. They had been expected to resume collecting signatures after the pandemic, but had been delayed by stalling from local legislators. Continuing the cause in 2021, the Preserve Navarre campaign began to conduct research regarding the feasibility of Navarre incorporation. Therefore, once again possibly reviving the political question for the future. The latter group has since released a feasibility study (later updated according to local feedback) and a proposed charter.

Geography

Location

It is located within a portion of the Florida Panhandle observing the Central Time Zone.

This figure however, does not include the shorelines on both sides of Santa Rosa Sound, and the Navarre's shoreline along East Bay and the East Bay River.

Topography
The community of Navarre is located on the Gulf Coastal Plain and is built on mostly flat sandy soil, though there are a few shallow hills. Navarre is primarily located on the Fairpoint Peninsula and Santa Rosa Island. Navarre is bounded geographically in the north by the East Bay River, the Yellow River, and several creeks and on the south by the Santa Rosa Sound. Holley, a different census-designated place that is sometimes considered part of Navarre, is north of the Fairpoint Peninsula, across the East Bay River.

Climate
The town is located towards the southern edge of the humid subtropical climate zone.

Hurricanes 

As a low-elevation community near the Gulf of Mexico, Navarre is often threatened by hurricanes. Significant damage was incurred as a result of hurricanes Erin and Opal in 1995, Georges in 1998, Ivan in 2004, Dennis in 2005 and Sally in 2020. Many homes and businesses immediately along Santa Rosa Sound (generally south of U.S. Highway 98) suffered storm surge as a result of those storms. Recoveries have been rendered by the area with the population quickly flourishing. This area of Florida is consistently listed as one of the worst places for hurricanes.

Navarre Beach

Navarre Beach is the beach neighborhood of Navarre and is, as of the 2020 census, its own census designated place. It is on Santa Rosa Island, a barrier island in the Gulf of Mexico. The 2020 population of the CDP is 1,123.

Immediately to its east is Navarre Beach Marine Park, a former Florida state park. Immediately to its west is a portion of the Gulf Islands National Seashore, and farther west is the community of Pensacola Beach.

Recent history 
In 2006, a "beach re-nourishment" project was begun, restoring sand lost due to the hurricanes of 2004 and 2005. The project was completed in December 2006. Another round of beach re-nourishment was completed in 2016.

The entirety of Navarre Beach was closed during the COVID-19 pandemic, with only residents of the beach neighborhood being allowed on that area of the island. Furtherly, It was enforced by a police check on one side of the Navarre Beach Causeway.

Demographics 
Navarre is a large community, estimated to have 41,940 people by the 2020 U.S. Census when including both the Navarre and Navarre Beach CDP. That number may be as high as 43,540, according to several different estimates completed since then. If the town of Navarre was to be incorporated it would be the largest city between Pensacola and Tallahassee (based on population). This is a major increase from just 40 years ago, when the population was hovering around 1,500. The below racial characteristics of the community are from 2017 estimates.

Non-Hispanic White 75.6%
African-American 9.0%
Hispanic 9.6%
Multiracial 5.2%
Asian 3.0%
Native Hawaiian and other Pacific Islander 0.2%
Native American and Alaska Native 0.2%

Attractions 

Navarre is centered near the junction of U.S. Highway 98, the primary east–west route between Pensacola and the Fort Walton Beach area, and State Road 87. It is located near several large military facilities: Naval Air Station Pensacola to the west; Hurlburt Field and Eglin Air Force Base to the east; and Naval Air Station Whiting Field to the North.

Tourism has increased in the Navarre area since 2010, being declared "Florida's Best Kept Secret" by the local hospitality business. Navarre has a park on the mainland next to Navarre Beach bridge and the Intracoastal Waterway that contains a visitor information center; water splash pad, playground, gazebos, pier and small beachfront. Boating, Surfing, jet skiing, paddle boarding, fishing, bird watching, exploring scenic trails, and walking/jogging are popular among the residents and visitors. Navarre's fourth hotel became the first beachfront hotel to operate since 2004 when it opened in 2017.

Eco-tourism and conservation 
Navarre is an increasing destination for ecotourism due to its location at the center of the Gulf of Mexico and several important statuaries, as well as its location at the southend of a large and undeveloped woodlands on Eglin Air Force Base. A half-dozen wildlife sanctuaries, conservation centers, and rehabilitation centers have opened in the previous decade to build onto this fact. This includes the: Emerald Coast Wildlife Refuge, Navarre Beach Marine Science Station, Navarre Beach Sea Turtle Conservation Center, Sandspur Wildlife Sanctuary, and the Navarre Beach Marine Life Sanctuary.

Navarre Beach Fishing Pier 

In 2010 the Navarre Beach Fishing Pier was rebuilt after repeated damage from hurricanes. At , it is currently the longest fishing pier on the Gulf of Mexico and in the state of Florida.

Former Butterfly House 
The Panhandle Butterfly House on Navarre Parkway opened in 1997. Around 14,000 visitors stop by each year to see butterflies up close, learn about their life cycle, and find out how to attract butterflies to their own gardens. A highlight each year is the monarch migration; the orange and black butterflies are seen in the thousands as they travel to and from Mexico to breed. Due to miscommunication on the fault of the Santa Rosa County Commission, the Butterfly House closed its Navarre Park location for the 2019 season. It moved to an historic home near Milton, Florida, a few miles north of Navarre, and reopened in 2021 in this new location.

Infrastructure

Education and library 
Education in Navarre is administrated by the Santa Rosa County District School system headquartered in Milton, Florida. The schools that serve the Navarre community are:

Navarre High School (Grades 9–12)
Holley-Navarre Middle School (Grades 6–8)
Holley-Navarre Intermediate School (Grades 3–5)
Holley-Navarre Primary School (Grades K–2)
Woodlawn Beach Middle School (Grades 6–8)
West Navarre Primary School (Grades K–2)
West Navarre Intermediate School (Grades 3–5)
East Bay K-8 School (Opened 2021; Grades K-8)

Public library services are provided by the Santa Rosa County Library System through the Navarre Library.

Parks and recreation 

The community of Navarre has several public parks open year-round. These parks are currently owned and operated by the Santa Rosa County Department of Parks and Recreation and are open to the public. The Navarre Sports Complex and Navarre Soccer Complex, while owned and largely managed by the county, are partially operated by the Navarre Youth Sports Association.

The largest of the parks are the Navarre Beach Marine Park, Navarre Park, and the Navarre Sports Complex.

Navarre Park provides a play area for children, basketball courts, picnic pavilions, and restroom facilities. The park hosts several large community events each year. 

In October 2020, Phase 1 of park renovations began. Enhancements to the park include an interactive splash pad, ADA accessible restroom facilities, playgrounds for two age groups, a plaza with shade structures, maintenance building, park building, expanded parking, landscaping and stormwater improvements. Phase 1 was completed in summer of 2022. Phase 1 included the placement of the original Navarre Beach sign, now on display in the park. Phase 2 and 3 expansions have been proposed.

Transportation 
Transportation infrastructure in Navarre is relatively limited and is dominated by roads, instead of public transportation or sidewalks. This has been to the chagrin of some local citizens. However, relatively little has been done to improve this within the last few years, beyond feasibility studies of possible improvements.

Roadways 
Navarre is centered on the intersection of U.S. Highway 98 (named "Navarre Parkway" while within the town) and Florida State Road 87 (which has no official name, though is sometimes called "the Navarre Beach Expressway" by local residents). These provide the two largest connections in and out of the town. The Parkway (US 98) connects west to Pensacola, ultimately ending in Mississippi, and connects east to Destin and Panama City, ultimately ending in Palm Beach, Florida. The Expressway has its southern terminus in Navarre; however, it connects north to Interstate 10 and Milton, then ending at the Alabama state border.

Navarre also has secondary connections through Florida State Road 399 and Santa Rosa County Road 399. Because of their matching shield numbers, the two are often confused by residents and tourists alike and are often instead referred to as "Gulf Boulevard" and "East Bay Boulevard" respectively. Gulf Boulevard, which has its northern terminus in Navarre, travels on Santa Rosa Island, ultimately going through the Opal Beach section of the Gulf Islands National Seashore, Pensacola Beach, then ending in Gulf Breeze. East Bay Boulevard, which has its eastern terminus in Navarre, travels roughly parallel to East Bay and the East Bay River. It also passes by Gable Lake and passes over the Tom King Bayou, before connecting with US 98 in the neighboring community of Woodlawn Beach, Florida.

Due to traffic flow issues on both the primary and secondary thoroughfares, a community access road has been proposed by citizens and county leaders alike. An inquiry into the feasibility of such a plan is being conducted by county officials.

Airports 
Navarre doesn't have a dedicated commercially served airport. Instead, it is largely served by Pensacola International Airport (about 25 miles west in Pensacola) and Destin–Fort Walton Beach Airport (about 30 miles east in Valparaiso, Florida).

Navarre does have one general aviation airfield, Fort Walton Beach Airport. The airfield has a single turf runway and primarily serves banner-towing aerial advertising aircraft, that fly advertisements along the beach.

Navarre did also host an outlying airfield of Naval Air Station Whiting Field, Naval Outlying Landing Field Holley; however, this airfield has since been converted into operations as one of the largest solar fields in the region. Currently being operated by Gulf Power, in cooperation with the United States Navy.

Public transportation
Navarre has limited public transportation, despite some public calls for it. However, it does receive service from Santa Rosa Transportation, which provides some limited on-demand accessibility service from the town.

Popular culture

Jaws 2

Most of the scenes in Jaws 2 were filmed in and around Navarre and Navarre Beach in 1977. The production of the movie "was a boost to the local economy because local boaters, extras and stand-ins or doubles were hired. Universal brought in actors, directors, producers and their wives, camera and crew people who needed housing, food and clothing for the movie. Services were needed for laundry, dry-cleaning and recreation." Navarre's Holiday Inn "Holidome" was used as the film's headquarters, with the ground floor converted into production offices, and some of the Gulf-front suites remodeled for David Brown and Roy Scheider. Universal rented 100 of the hotel's 200 rooms, spending $1 million. The Holiday Inn was destroyed in the 2004 Atlantic hurricane season. A new hotel was built on the same site as the Holiday Inn and was completed during the summer of 2017.

Entanglement series 
A book in the Entanglement science fiction novel series, Entanglement: The Surface,  is set in Navarre. Navarre High School (under the name Navarre Beach High School) is a primary setting.

Notable people

Entertainment
Logan Bauer, finalist on the 29th Season of the Amazing Race
Anne Rice, gothic fiction writer

Government
Joel Rudman, representative to the Florida House of Representatives for the 3rd district
Guy Wyman, colonel during World War I, founder of modern-day Navarre, Florida

Sports
Michael Carter, running back for the New York Jets
Matt Cronin, relief pitcher for the Rochester Red Wings
Jordan Leggett, reserve tight end for the Denver Broncos
Michael "Crash" Lockwood, WWE wrestler
Akeem Spence, defensive tackle for the San Francisco 49ers
Jeff Van Camp, former quarterback for the Florida Atlantic Owls

See also
Gulf Breeze
Pensacola Metro Area
Santa Rosa County, Florida
Woodlawn Beach

References

External links

 Greatest Navarre Area Chamber of Commerce
 Holley-Navarre Historical Society
 Navarre Beach Area Official Visitor Information: Florida Beaches to Rivers
 Holley-Navarre Fire District

 
Census-designated places in Florida
Populated places on the Intracoastal Waterway in Florida
Towns in Santa Rosa County, Florida
Unincorporated communities in Florida
Unincorporated communities in Santa Rosa County, Florida